Collagen alpha-1(X) chain is a protein that in humans is a member of the collagen family encoded by the COL10A1 gene.

This gene encodes the alpha chain of type X collagen, a short chain collagen expressed by hypertrophic chondrocytes during endochondral ossification. Unlike type VIII collagen, the other short chain collagen, type X collagen is a homotrimer. Type X collagen has a short triple helical collagen domain flanked by the N-terminal NC2 and the C-terminal NC1 domains. The C-terminal NC1 domain has complement C1q-like structure.  Collagen X forms hexamer complexes through the association of NC1 regions. Mutations in this gene are associated with Schmid type metaphyseal chondrodysplasia (SMCD) and Japanese type spondylometaphyseal dysplasia (SMD).

DDR2 is a collagen receptor for it.

Recent studies into the early detection of colon cancer have identified COL10A1 protein levels in serum as a potential diagnostic biomarker candidate to detect both adenoma lesions and tumor.

Collagen alpha-1(X) undergoes degradation in the active growth plate releasing an intact NC1 region with a small amount of collagenous region attached. This degradation byproduct has been deemed CXM and has potential to be a useful biomarker to assess real time growth velocity in children and fracture healing in adults.

References

Further reading